Thomas Hoeflaak (born 29 November 1981 in Haarlem), performing as Toyax, is a Dutch DJ.

Career 
Thomas Hoeflaak interest in music started in 1994, when he got in touch with trance and rave. 1999, he built his own music studio Wheaton Studios. He sent his first demo to q-dance for the Qlubtempo talentroom and got 2 months later the reply to play there. Toyax played at Nature One, Electronic Family, Grotesque, Defqon.1 and more than 300 parties in the Netherlands, Germany, Luxembourg and Belgium alongside Tiesto, Paul van Dyk, Armin van Buuren, Carl Cox, and Ferry Corsten.

In 2008 Toyax released his first track Just Before I Left on the label Tektra Music.

Singles 
 2008: Just Before I Left (vs. Jimmy Santano)
 2017: Melody Is Everywhere
 2018: The Epitome Of Emotions
 2018: It's All About Love
 2018: Dreaming Of Summer (vs. Alexey Polozok)
 2018: Waiting For The Summer / Heaven's Tears 
 2018: Summer Memories (vs. Terry Bones)
 2018: Azaela (vs. Madwave)
 2020: My Love Of My Life (with MakeFlame)

References

External links
 Toyax's Discogs
 Toyax's Facebook
 Toyax's MySpace
 Toyax's Soundcloud
 Toyax's Youtube

1981 births
Living people
Dutch DJs
Club DJs
Dutch record producers
Dutch trance musicians
Electronic dance music DJs